Free Brazil Movement (MBL) is a Brazilian conservative and economically liberal movement founded in 2014. Initially a ramification of the Brazilian branch of Students for Liberty, it grew boarding the political dissatisfaction after the 2013 protests in Brazil, receiving funding from external (e.g.: Atlas Network) and internal (e.g.: Democratas, PSDB, PMDB) sources. Its leader is the activist and lawmaker Kim Kataguiri.

According to the newspaper Folha de S.Paulo, the MBL was mainly responsible for the convening of the demonstrations of 15 March and 12 April in 2015 against the social governmental establishment of Dilma Rousseff and the Workers' Party. The group's headquarters are located in São Paulo, and according to The Economist, was "founded last year to promote the answers of the free market for the country's problems" In manifesto published on the internet, the MBL, often described as the "Brazilian Tea Party", cites its five goals, "free and independent press, economic freedom, separation of powers, free and reputable elections, and the end of direct and indirect subsidies to dictatorships".
 
The movement also voices strong opposition to cultural liberal ideas such as the rights to abortion and mandated gender-equality efforts. It has been described therefore as "liberal towards economics and conservative towards habits" (sic).

Many of the movement's pages were removed from Facebook in August 2018, before the 2018 elections, under the justification that they were being used to promote fake news.

References

External links 
 

2014 establishments in Brazil
Anti-communism in Brazil
Anti-communist organizations
Conservatism in Brazil
Economic liberalism
Libertarian organizations
Libertarianism in South America
Organisations based in São Paulo
Organizations established in 2014
Social movements in Brazil